The 1990 Individual Speedway World Championship was the 45th edition of the official World Championship to determine the world champion rider.

The Final was held at the Odsal Stadium in Bradford, England. It would be the 28th and last time the World Final would be held in England under the traditional single meeting format. 

Sweden's Per Jonsson won his only World Individual Championship to become the first Swedish World Champion since Anders Michanek in 1974 and became the first rider to win both the Under-21 and Senior World Championships having previously won the 1985 Under-21 World Championship. Jonsson defeated Shawn Moran from the United States in a run-off after both finished the meeting on 13 points. Moran was later stripped of his second place by the FIM for failing a drug test taken at the Overseas Final. After Moran's disqualification, the FIM did not upgrade the placings, thus records show no second place rider for the 1990 World Final. Australian youngster Todd Wiltshire, believed by many judges to be one who would be making up the numbers in his first World Final, finished third with 12 points after winning his first two rides. 

After having won each World Final since 1984, including five 1-2 finishes and taking all podium places in 1988, the 1990 World Final saw no Danish riders finishing on the podium for the first time since 1983. Defending champion Hans Nielsen, the only Dane in the field following an injury to Jan O. Pedersen which kept him from riding, finished in 4th place with 11 points.

Overseas Series

New Zealand Qualification
First 2 from New Zealand final to Commonwealth final

Australian Qualification
First 4 from Australian final to Commonwealth final

North American Final
June 2, 1990
 Long Beach, Veterans Memorial Stadium
First 4 to the Overseas Final plus 1 reserve

Nordic Final
June 9, 1990
 Linköping, Motorstadium
First 7 to the Intercontinental Final plus 1 reserve

Commonwealth Final

Overseas Final

Intercontinental Final

Continental Final
August 12, 1990
 Norden, Motodrom Halbemond
First 5 to the World Final plus 1 reserve

World final
September 1, 1990
 Bradford, Odsal Stadium

Classification

* Henrik Gustafsson and Antonín Kasper Jr. replaced injured qualifiers Jan O. Pedersen and Gerd Riss

Notes:
a. Shawn Moran scored 13 points and lost the run-off to Per Jonsson. However, Moran had failed a random drug and alcohol test taken three months earlier at the Overseas Final, and was subsequently disqualified from second place. The FIM did not upgrade the standings and the official records show no second place rider.

References

Books

External links
The event at SVT's open archive 

1990
Individual Speedway
Individual Speedway
1990 in British motorsport
Speedway competitions in the United Kingdom